The 1926 San Diego State Aztecs football team represented San Diego State Teachers College during the 1926 NCAA football season. San Diego State competed as a member of the Southern California Intercollegiate Athletic Conference (SCIAC) in 1926. They had played as an Independent the previous year.

The 1926 San Diego State team was led by head coach Charles E. Peterson in his sixth season as football coach of the Aztecs. They played home games at Navy "Sports" Field. The Aztecs finished the season with three wins, four losses and one tie (3–4–1, 1–3–1 SCIAC). Overall, the team was outscored by its opponents 78–150 points for the season.

Schedule

Notes

References

San Diego State
San Diego State Aztecs football seasons
San Diego State Aztecs football